John Houston Stockton (born March 26, 1962) is an American former professional basketball player. Regarded as one of the greatest point guards, players and passers of all time, he spent his entire NBA career (1984–2003) with the Utah Jazz, and the team made the playoffs in each of his 19 seasons. In 1997 and 1998, together with his longtime teammate Karl Malone, Stockton led the Jazz to the franchise's only two NBA Finals appearances, both of which were lost to the Chicago Bulls.

Stockton was a ten-time NBA All-Star and holds the NBA records for most career assists and steals by wide margins. He was inducted into the Naismith Memorial Basketball Hall of Fame in 2009 for his individual career, and again in 2010 as a member of the 1992 United States Olympic basketball team. In 1996, he was named one of the 50 greatest players in NBA history. In October 2021, Stockton was again honored as one of the league’s greatest players of all-time by being named to the NBA 75th Anniversary Team.

Early years
Born in Spokane, Washington, to Clementine and Jack Stockton. He attended grade school at St. Aloysius and moved on to high school at Gonzaga Prep and graduated in 1980, after breaking the city record for points scored in a single basketball season.

College career
After considering offers from Don Monson at Idaho and Mike Montgomery at Montana (both in the Big Sky Conference), Stockton decided to stay in Spokane and play college basketball for Dan Fitzgerald at Gonzaga University. He became the third generation in his family at GU; grandfather Houston Stockton was a well-known football player for the Bulldogs in the 1920s. Fitzgerald was also the athletic director; he stepped away from coaching for four years after Stockton's freshman year and promoted assistant Jay Hillock to head coach.

During his senior year for the Bulldogs in 1984, Stockton averaged 20.9 points per game shooting 57% from the field. The Zags posted a 17–11 record, their best in 17 years, and Stockton led the West Coast Athletic Conference in scoring, assists, and steals. For his performance, he was named WCAC Player of the Year, the first-ever Gonzaga player to earn the award.

He was one of 74 college players invited to the spring tryouts for the 1984 U.S. Olympic team and coached by Bob Knight. Stockton made the initial cut in April to the final 20, but was one of four released in May (with Charles Barkley, Terry Porter, and Maurice Martin) in the penultimate cut to 16 players. Though not selected, the experience led him to meet his future teammate and friend, Karl Malone.

Professional career

Utah Jazz (1984–2003) 
In June 1984, Stockton was selected by the Utah Jazz in the first round of the 1984 NBA draft with the 16th overall pick. Though he was relatively unknown during his college career, his stock rose significantly in the months before the draft. Nevertheless, the announcement of his selection to the thousands of Jazz fans gathered at the Salt Palace on draft day was met with a stunned silence. On November 10, 1984, Stockton had his highest scoring game as a rookie, with 19 points in only 19 minutes of playing time, during a loss against the Denver Nuggets.

Stockton became the starting point guard for the Jazz in the 1987–88 season. In 1988–89, he played in his first All-Star Game, and led the NBA in assists per game for the first of nine consecutive seasons. 

On January 15, 1991, Stockton scored 20 points and dished out a career-high and franchise-record 28 assists in a 124–102 home win against the San Antonio Spurs. On February 12, Stockton nearly recorded a triple-double after putting up 19 points, 11 assists, and 9 steals in a 113–92 win over the Houston Rockets.

In 1992, Stockton and the Jazz reached the Western Conference Finals for the first time however they were defeated by the Portland Trail Blazers in six games. Along with Malone, Stockton was named co-MVP of the All-Star Game in 1993 and the game was held in Salt Lake City. 

During the 1994-95 season, Stockton achieved many milestones. On February 1, 1995, he passed Magic Johnson (who had 9,921 assists) as the NBA's all-time leader in assists as he dished out 16 assists in a 129-98 victory over the visiting Denver Nuggets. His 16 assists gave him 9,937 assists for his career at that time. Magic Johnson, in an interview, said to Stockton, "John, from one assist man to another, you are the greatest team leader I have ever played against." Seventeen days later, Stockton dished out 15 assists in a 108-98 victory over the Boston Celtics. His 15 assists gave him a career total of 10,008 assists, the first ever player to have dished out 10,000 assists in his career. On March 25, Stockton just became the second player in NBA history to have recorded 2,000 steals after recording 6 steals in a 117-110 loss to the Dallas Mavericks.

Stockton and the Jazz reached the Conference Finals again in 1994 and 1996, but lost to the Houston Rockets and the Seattle SuperSonics, respectively.

Utah set a franchise record and led the Western Conference with 64 wins in the 1996–97 season. The team again reached the Western Conference Finals. In Game Six of the Conference Finals, Stockton scored 25 points, dished out 13 assists, and made a buzzer-beating, game-winning three-point shot over the Rockets' Charles Barkley to send the Jazz to the first of two consecutive NBA Finals appearances. Stockton's game-winner became known as "The Shot". In Game 3 of the 1997 NBA Finals, Stockton recorded 17 points, 7 rebounds and 12 assists in their first Finals' win in franchise history. The Jazz were defeated by the Michael Jordan-led Chicago Bulls in six games in the Finals.

Stockton missed the first 18 games of the 1997–98 season with a knee injury, but the Jazz returned to the NBA Finals and again faced the Bulls. In Game 6 of the 1998 NBA Finals, Stockton made a three-pointer with 41.9 seconds left to give the Jazz a lead, but Bulls guard Michael Jordan made two field goals to put his team ahead 87–86. Stockton missed a three-point attempt with 5.2 seconds left and said in a post-game interview that he felt confident the shot would go in. The Bulls again defeated the Jazz in six games.

The Jazz made the NBA playoffs every season during Stockton's 19-year NBA career.

Retirement
On May 2, 2003, Stockton announced his retirement with a released statement instead of the customary news conference. The Jazz later held a retirement ceremony for him, in which Salt Lake City renamed the street in front of the venue then known as Delta Center (now Vivint Arena), where the Jazz play, John Stockton Drive. Stockton would later declare that despite being still content with the game and how well he was playing, his growing family made him feel that "sitting in the hotel room waiting for games wasn't making up for what I was missing at home."

Stockton's number 12 jersey was retired by the Jazz during a game on November 22, 2004. A statue of Stockton can be seen in front of Vivint Arena; an accompanying statue of Karl Malone was placed nearby on March 23, 2006. The Malone and Stockton statues stand on a bronze plaque commemorating their achievements together. Stockton was inducted into the Naismith Memorial Basketball Hall of Fame in 2009. Stockton was also inducted into the Hall of Fame along with the rest of the 1992 United States men's Olympic basketball team in 2010.

Player profile
Stockton missed only 22 games in his 19-season career. In his first 13 seasons, he missed only four games (all in the 1989–90 season) until he missed the first 18 games of the 1997–98 season due to an injured MCL in his left knee sustained in the preseason. That was the only major injury in his career, and he never missed another game after returning from that injury. Stockton earned the "old school" tag for his physical play; surveys of athletes and fans alike often judged him among the toughest players in the NBA, usually just behind teammate Karl Malone. Stockton's tenacity also earned him a reputation among some in the league as being a dirty player, as suggested by a poll Sports Illustrated conducted in 1997 where he was voted as the second dirtiest player in the league behind Dennis Rodman. His patented "short shorts" became known as "Stocktons"—since he continued to wear the style long after the rest of the league had adopted a baggier look.

Stockton's career is also notable for its consistency and longevity. He remained a starting NBA player until his retirement at age 41. Stockton avoided most endorsements and stayed loyal to Utah despite being offered more money by other teams. In 1996, he agreed to a deal that made salary-cap space available so the team could improve, but in exchange, he insisted on guaranteed Delta Center ice time for his son's hockey team.

For many years, Karl Malone and Stockton were the Jazz's one-two punch. The two played a record 1,412 regular season games together as teammates. Many of Stockton's assists resulted from passes to Malone. Stockton and Malone have been described as the greatest pick-and-roll combination of all time. Stockton and Malone are also considered two of the best players who never won an NBA championship.

Stockton holds a commanding lead for the NBA record for career assists with 15,806. Stockton also holds the record for assists-per-game average over one season (14.5 in 1990) and is one of three players who have logged more than 1,000 assists in one season, joining Kevin Porter (1,099 in 1979) and Isiah Thomas (1,123 in 1985) in the exclusive list. Stockton did this seven times, with season totals of 1,164, 1,134, 1,128, 1,126, 1,118, 1,031 and 1,011 assists.

On defense, Stockton holds the NBA record for career steals with 3,265. Stockton was also a capable scorer (13.1 points per game career average and a 51.5 career shooting percentage) with a reliable three-point shot (38.4% lifetime average). As of February 2023, he is 55th on the all-time NBA scoring list with 19,711 career points.

Stockton was selected to the All-NBA First Team twice, the All-NBA Second Team six times, the All-NBA Third Team three times, and the NBA All-Defensive Second Team five times. He was selected to 10 All-Star Games. He was named one of the 50 Greatest Players in NBA history in 1996. On May 11, 2006, ESPN.com named Stockton the fourth best point guard of all time. In October 2021, Stockton was again honored as one of the league’s greatest players of all-time by being named to the NBA 75th Anniversary Team In 1999, Sports Illustrated named Stockton as the best athlete to come out of the state of Washington in the 20th century. In 2022, to commemorate the NBA's 75th Anniversary The Athletic ranked their top 75 players of all time, and named Stockton as the 25th greatest player in NBA history.

Awards and Achievements

Regular Season

 Only player in NBA history to record multiple games with at least 25 assists made. (3)
 One of two players in NBA history to lead the league in steals and assists in the same season. (2)
 Includes Chris Paul (achieved this 3 times)

 1st place all-time in career assists with 15,806.
 1st place all-time in career steals with 3,265.
 1st place all-time for games with at least 1 assist made with 1,501.
 1st place all-time for games with at least 2 assists made with 1,494.
 1st place all-time for games with at least 3 assists made with 1,472.
 1st place all-time for games with at least 4 assists made with 1,435
 1st place all-time for games with at least 5 assists made with 1,382.
 1st place all-time for games with at least 6 assists made with 1,311.
 1st place all-time for games with at least 7 assists made with 1,217.
 1st place all-time for games with at least 8 assists made with 1,093
 1st place all-time for games with at least 9 assists made with 996.
 1st place all-time for games with at least 10 assists made with 863.
 1st place all-time for games with at least 11 assists made with 724.
 1st place all-time for games with at least 12 assists made with 590.
 1st place all-time for games with at least 13 assists made with 469.
 1st place all-time for games with at least 14 assists made with 379.
 1st place all-time for games with at least 15 assists made with 293.
 1st place all-time for games with at least 16 assists made with 210.
 1st place all-time for games with at least 17 assists made with 139.
 1st place all-time for games with at least 18 assists made with 91.
 1st place all-time for games with at least 19 assists made with 60.
 1st place all-time for games with at least 20 assists made with 34.
 1st place all-time for games with at least 21 assists made with 21.
 1st place all-time for games with at least 22 assists made with 11.
 1st place all-time for games with at least 23 assists made with 8.
 1st place all-time for games with at least 24 assists made with 4.
 1st place all-time for games with at least 25 assists made with 3.
 1st place all-time for most seasons leading the league in assists made with 9.
 1st place all-time for games with at least 2 steals with 911.
 1st place all-time for games with at least 3 steals with 556.
 1st place all time for games with at least 4 steals with 292.
 1st place all time for games with at least 6 steals with 62.

International play
Stockton, along with other NBA stars, played on the basketball team in that year's Olympics in Barcelona, Spain. The 1992 team was the first U.S. Olympic squad to feature NBA players. The team became known as the Dream Team; the Naismith Memorial Basketball Hall of Fame called it "the greatest collection of basketball talent on the planet". Stockton also played on the 1996 U.S. men's Olympic basketball team. Stockton won gold medals with both the 1992 and 1996 teams.

Post-retirement activities
Following his retirement, Stockton moved back to his hometown Spokane. He started coaching in youth teams, being "an assistant on seven or eight teams at once" in 2003. The Jazz also invited Stockton to train both Deron Williams and Trey Burke. Stockton also became involved in various businesses including construction projects.

In 2013, Stockton released an autobiography entitled Assisted. The book was written with the assistance of his junior high school coach, Kerry L. Pickett. Karl Malone wrote the foreword. Stockton was on the Jazz's long list of coaching candidates to replace Tyrone Corbin before the selection of Quin Snyder.

On October 27, 2015, Stockton joined Montana State University's women's basketball program as an assistant coach to replace Kellee Barney. Barney left the program to pursue a career in business, and Stockton had previously coached four of the players on the MSU women's team when they played for teams in Amateur Athletic Union leagues.

In 2021, Stockton appeared in a video series titled "V-Revealed, COVID Edition," raising doubt about the COVID-19 pandemic and warning against vaccines. Stockton said he had done a "significant amount of research" and determined, "This isn't a virus cheating us of these opportunities. It's the guys making decisions saying, 'No, no, we're too scared. We're going to shut everything down. He made the claim that "hundreds" of athletes had died due to receiving a COVID vaccine, which was found by PolitiFact to be a false statement. In January 2022, Gonzaga suspended his season tickets because of his refusal to comply with the university's mask mandate.

Personal life

Hust Stockton, Stockton's grandfather (born John Houston Stockton) played professional football for the Frankford Yellow Jackets in the nascent National Football League in the 1920s; Stockton was a member of the Yellow Jackets' 1926 NFL Championship team.

Stockton and his wife, the former Nada Stepovich (the daughter of Matilda Stepovich and Mike Stepovich, the last territorial governor of Alaska) reside in Spokane. They have two daughters (Lindsay and Laura) and four sons (Houston, Michael, David, and Samuel). Stockton and his family are Roman Catholics.

Houston Stockton played college football as a defensive back for the University of Montana Grizzlies. In 2011, Michael Stockton, who played basketball at Salt Lake City's Westminster College, signed with BG Karlsruhe in Germany's second basketball division. In 2017, Michael signed with BG Göttingen in Germany's first basketball division, the Basketball Bundesliga. David Stockton completed his college basketball career at Gonzaga in 2014 and, after playing for the Reno Bighorns in the NBA's Development League, played for the NBA's Sacramento Kings and Utah Jazz. Daughter Lindsay Stockton played basketball for Montana State University and daughter Laura Stockton played basketball at Gonzaga. Laura signed her first professional contract to play for Herner TC in Germany in 2020.

Stockton has a brother and three nephews who have played college basketball. Steve Stockton, his brother, played for the University of Washington. Steve Stockton's oldest son, Steve Stockton Jr. played at Whitworth College; another son, Shawn Stockton finished his college basketball career at the University of Montana in the 2011–12 season; and Steve's youngest son, Riley played for Seattle Pacific.

NBA career statistics

Regular season

|-
| style="text-align:left;"|
| style="text-align:left;"|Utah
| 82 || 5 || 18.2 || .471 || .182 || .736 || 1.3 || 5.1 || 1.3 || .1 || 5.6
|-
| style="text-align:left;"|
| style="text-align:left;"|Utah
| 82 || 38 || 23.6 || .489 || .133 || .839 || 2.2 || 7.4 || 1.9 || .1 || 7.7
|-
| style="text-align:left;"|
| style="text-align:left;"|Utah
| 82 || 2 || 22.7 || .499 || .179 || .782 || 1.8 || 8.2 || 2.2 || .2 || 7.9
|-
| style="text-align:left;"|
| style="text-align:left;"|Utah
| 82 || 79 || 34.7 || .574 || .358 || .840 || 2.9 || style="background:#cfecec;"|13.8* || 3.0 || .2 || 14.7
|-
| style="text-align:left;"|
| style="text-align:left;"|Utah
| 82 || 82 || 38.7 || .538 || .242 || .863 || 3.0 || style="background:#cfecec;"|13.6* || style="background:#cfecec;"|3.2* || .2 || 17.1
|-
| style="text-align:left;"|
| style="text-align:left;"|Utah
| 78 || 78 || 37.4 || .514 || .416 || .819 || 2.6 || style="background:#e0cef2;"|14.5 || 2.7 || .2 || 17.2
|-
| style="text-align:left;"|
| style="text-align:left;"|Utah
| 82 || 82 || 37.8 || .507 || .345 || .836 || 2.9 || style="background:#cfecec;"|14.2* || 2.9 || .2 || 17.2
|-
| style="text-align:left;"|
| style="text-align:left;"|Utah
| 82 || 82 || 36.6 || .482 || .407 || .842 || 3.3 || style="background:#cfecec;"|13.7* || style="background:#cfecec;"|3.0* || .3 || 15.8
|-
| style="text-align:left;"|
| style="text-align:left;"|Utah
| 82 || 82 || 34.9 || .486 || .385 || .798 || 2.9 || style="background:#cfecec;"|12.0* || 2.4 || .3 || 15.1
|-
| style="text-align:left;"|
| style="text-align:left;"|Utah
| 82 || 82 || 36.2 || .528 || .322 || .805 || 3.1 || style="background:#cfecec;"|12.6* || 2.4 || .3 || 15.1
|-
| style="text-align:left;"|
| style="text-align:left;"|Utah
| 82 || 82 || 35.0 || .542 || .449 || .804 || 3.1 || style="background:#cfecec;"|12.3* || 2.4 || .3 || 14.7
|-
| style="text-align:left;"|
| style="text-align:left;"|Utah
| 82 || 82 || 35.5 || .538 || .422 || .830 || 2.8 || style="background:#cfecec;"|11.2* || 1.7 || .2 || 14.7
|-
| style="text-align:left;"|
| style="text-align:left;"|Utah
| 82 || 82 || 35.3 || .548 || .422 || .846 || 2.8 || 10.5 || 2.0 || .2 || 14.4
|-
| style="text-align:left;"|
| style="text-align:left;"|Utah
| 64 || 64 || 29.0 || .528 || .429 || .827 || 2.6 || 8.5 || 1.4 || .2 || 12.0
|-
| style="text-align:left;"|
| style="text-align:left;"|Utah
| 50 || 50 || 28.2 || .488 || .320 || .811 || 2.9 || 7.5 || 1.6 || .3 || 11.1
|-
| style="text-align:left;"|
| style="text-align:left;"|Utah
| 82 || 82 || 29.7 || .501 || .355 || .860 || 2.6 || 8.6 || 1.7 || .2 || 12.1
|-
| style="text-align:left;"|
| style="text-align:left;"|Utah
| 82 || 82 || 29.1 || .504 || .462 || .817 || 2.8 || 8.7 || 1.6 || .3 || 11.5
|-
| style="text-align:left;"|
| style="text-align:left;"|Utah
| 82 || 82 || 31.3 || .517 || .321 || .857 || 3.2 || 8.2 || 1.9 || .3 || 13.4
|-
| style="text-align:left;"|
| style="text-align:left;"|Utah
| 82 || 82 || 27.7 || .483 || .363 || .826 || 2.5 || 7.7 || 1.7 || .2 || 10.8
|- class="sortbottom"
| style="text-align:center;" colspan="2"|Career
| 1,504 || 1,300 || 31.8 || .515 || .384 || .826 || 2.7 || 10.5 || 2.2 || .2 || 13.1
|- class="sortbottom"
| style="text-align:center;" colspan="2"|All-Star
| 10 || 5 || 19.7 || .530 || .333 || .667 || 1.7 || 7.1 || 1.6 || .1 || 8.1

Playoffs

|-
| style="text-align:left;"|1985
| style="text-align:left;"|Utah
| 10 || 0 || 18.6 || .467 || .000 || .743 || 2.8 || 4.3 || 1.1 || .2 || 6.8
|-
| style="text-align:left;"|1986
| style="text-align:left;"|Utah
| 4 || 0 || 14.3 || .529 || 1.000 || .889 || 1.5 || 3.5 || 1.3 || .0 || 6.8
|-
| style="text-align:left;"|1987
| style="text-align:left;"|Utah
| 5 || 2 || 31.4 || .621 || .800 || .729 || 2.2 || 8.0 || 3.0 || .2 || 10.0
|-
| style="text-align:left;"|1988
| style="text-align:left;"|Utah
| 11 || 11 || 43.5 || .507 || .286 || .824 || 4.1 || 14.8 || 3.4 || .3 || 19.5
|-
| style="text-align:left;"|1989
| style="text-align:left;"|Utah
| 3 || 3 || 46.3 || .508 || .750 || .905 || 3.3 || 13.7 || 3.7 || 1.7 || 27.3
|-
| style="text-align:left;"|1990
| style="text-align:left;"|Utah
| 5 || 5 || 38.8 || .420 || .077 || .800 || 3.2 || 15.0 || 1.2 || .0 || 15.0
|-
| style="text-align:left;"|1991
| style="text-align:left;"|Utah
| 9 || 9 || 41.4 || .537 || .407 || .841 || 4.7 || 13.8 || 2.2 || .2 || 18.2
|-
| style="text-align:left;"|1992
| style="text-align:left;"|Utah
| 16 || 16 || 38.9 || .423 || .310 || .833 || 2.9|| 13.6 || 2.1 || .3 || 14.8
|-
| style="text-align:left;"|1993
| style="text-align:left;"|Utah
| 5 || 5 || 38.6 || .451 || .385 || .833 || 2.4 || 11.0 || 2.4 || .0 || 13.2
|-
| style="text-align:left;"|1994
| style="text-align:left;"|Utah
| 16 || 16 || 37.3 || .456 || .167 || .810 || 3.3 || 9.8 || 1.7 || .5 || 14.4
|-
| style="text-align:left;"|1995
| style="text-align:left;"|Utah
| 5 || 5 || 38.6 || .459 || .400 || .765 || 3.4 || 10.2 || 1.4 || .2 || 17.8
|-
| style="text-align:left;"|1996
| style="text-align:left;"|Utah
| 18 || 18 || 37.7 || .446 || .289 || .814 || 3.2 || 10.8 || 1.6 || .4 || 11.1
|-
| style="text-align:left;"|1997
| style="text-align:left;"|Utah
| 20 || 20 || 37.0 || .521 || .380 || .856 || 3.9 || 9.6 || 1.7 || .3 || 16.1
|-
| style="text-align:left;"|1998
| style="text-align:left;"|Utah
| 20 || 20 || 29.8 || .494 || .346 || .718 || 3.0 || 7.8 || 1.6 || .2 || 11.1
|-
| style="text-align:left;"|1999
| style="text-align:left;"|Utah
| 11 || 11 || 32.0 || .400 || .333 || .739 || 3.3 || 8.4 || 1.6 || .1 || 11.1
|-
| style="text-align:left;"|2000
| style="text-align:left;"|Utah
| 10 || 10 || 35.0 || .461 || .389 || .767 || 3.0 || 10.3 || 1.3 || .2 || 11.2
|-
| style="text-align:left;"|2001
| style="text-align:left;"|Utah
| 5 || 5 || 37.2 || .459 || .000 || .714 || 5.6 || 11.4 || 2.0 || .6 || 9.8
|-
| style="text-align:left;"|2002
| style="text-align:left;"|Utah
| 4 || 4 || 35.3 || .450 || .286 || .923 || 4.0 || 10.0 || 2.8 || .3 || 12.5
|-
| style="text-align:left;"|2003
| style="text-align:left;"|Utah
| 5 || 5 || 29.8 || .462 || .000 || 1.000 || 3.2 || 5.2 || 1.6 || .2 || 11.2
|- class="sortbottom"
| style="text-align:center;" colspan="2"|Career
| 182 || 165 || 35.2 || .473 || .326 || .810 || 3.3 || 10.1 || 1.9 || .3 || 13.4

See also
 List of National Basketball Association career games played leaders
 List of National Basketball Association career assists leaders
 List of National Basketball Association career steals leaders
 List of National Basketball Association career turnovers leaders
 List of National Basketball Association career free throw scoring leaders
 List of National Basketball Association career minutes played leaders
 List of National Basketball Association career playoff assists leaders
 List of National Basketball Association career playoff steals leaders
 List of National Basketball Association career playoff turnovers leaders
 List of National Basketball Association players with most assists in a game
 List of National Basketball Association players with most steals in a game
 List of National Basketball Association seasons played leaders
 List of NBA players who have spent their entire career with one franchise
 List of second-generation National Basketball Association players

References

External links

 NBA history profile
 

1962 births
Living people
American men's basketball players
American people of Irish descent
American people of Swiss-German descent
American Roman Catholics
American women's basketball coaches
Basketball coaches from Washington (state)
Basketball players at the 1992 Summer Olympics
Basketball players at the 1996 Summer Olympics
Basketball players from Spokane, Washington
Gonzaga Bulldogs men's basketball players
Gonzaga Preparatory School alumni
Medalists at the 1992 Summer Olympics
Medalists at the 1996 Summer Olympics
Montana State Bobcats women's basketball coaches
Naismith Memorial Basketball Hall of Fame inductees
National Basketball Association All-Stars
National Basketball Association players with retired numbers
Olympic gold medalists for the United States in basketball
Point guards
United States men's national basketball team players
Utah Jazz draft picks
Utah Jazz players